Barbora Šumová (born 17 February 1995) is a Czech sport shooter. 

She won a silver medal in Skeet Mixed Team at the 2021 European Shooting Championships, jointly with Jakub Tomeček. She qualified to represent the Czech Republic at the 2020 Summer Olympics in Tokyo 2021, competing in women's skeet.

References

 

1995 births
Living people
Czech female sport shooters
Shooters at the 2020 Summer Olympics
Olympic shooters of the Czech Republic
Sportspeople from Kolín
21st-century Czech women